Vedbo may refer to any of three hundreds (administrative divisions) in Sweden:

Vedbo Hundred, a hundred of Dalsland in Sweden
Vedbo Northern Hundred, a hundred divided between Småland and Östergötland in Sweden
Vedbo Southern Hundred, a hundred of Småland in Sweden

See also
 List of hundreds of Sweden